The 1892 NYU Violets football team was an American football team that represented New York University as an independent during the 1892 college football season. The Violets compiled an 0–1 record for the season.

Schedule

References

NYU
NYU Violets football seasons
NYU Violets football
College football winless seasons